Maurice Cummins (born 25 February 1953) is a former Irish Fine Gael politician who served as Leader of the Seanad and Leader of Fine Gael in the Seanad from 2011 to 2016. He was a Senator for Labour Panel from 2002 to 2016.

He was first elected as a Senator in 2002, for the Labour Panel, and was re-elected in 2007 and 2011. He was a member of Waterford City Council formerly Waterford Corporation from 1979 to 2002, and was Mayor of Waterford in 1995–96. He was an unsuccessful Dáil candidate for the Waterford constituency at the 1992, 1997 and 2002 general elections.

He was the Leader of the Seanad from May 2011 until April 2016 when he lost his seat.

References

1953 births
Living people
Fine Gael senators
Local councillors in County Waterford
Mayors of Waterford
Members of the 22nd Seanad
Members of the 23rd Seanad
Members of the 24th Seanad
People educated at De La Salle College Waterford